Canyon del Oro High School (CDO) is a comprehensive public high school in Oro Valley, Arizona, located  north of Tucson at the base of Pusch Ridge. Established in 1964, CDO is one of three high schools of Amphitheater Public Schools and serves about 1,600 students in grades 9–12. The school name originates from the remote Canyon del Oro (Spanish for Canyon of Gold) in the nearby Santa Catalina Mountains north of Tucson. The school mascot is the Dorado, a mythical Latin American warrior. The school colors are forest green and gold. The Dorado mascot was designed and painted on the gymnasium floor by former art teacher Diane Redhair in the mid-1960s. Her design was based on two different winning submissions by CDO students John Epling and Kenny Harris who had submitted their designs to a school-wide competition.

CDO is primarily known for its academic program and the notable number of Major League Baseball players the school has produced in recent decades. CDO is statistically one of the highest achieving schools in Arizona, both academically and athletically. In 2007, 2010, and again in 2011, Newsweek Magazine rated CDO in the top 5% of public schools in the U.S., one of a handful of schools in Arizona included on the list. In 2011, Newsweek ranked CDO No. 408 in its list of top public schools in the U.S. (top 1.5 percent nationally). From 2005 to the present, CDO has consistently been academically classified as Excelling by the Arizona Department of Education (top 10 percent in Arizona). Between 2000 and 2010, CDO has graduated 42 National Merit Scholarship Semifinalists. CDO is also home to the 2011 Arizona Academic Decathlon State Champions, with the team finishing 5th in the National Academic Decathlon competition. The team placed as State Champion in 2009, finishing 4th in the National Academic Decathlon, State Runner-Up in 2007, 2008, and 2010, and was State Champion in 2006, finishing 5th in the National Academic Decathlon. CDO is also ranked 2nd in Arizona for the most all-time state championships in 4A & 5A (large school) team sports as of 2006 (Arizona Interscholastic Association).

Recent notable awards and recognition 
2011: Newsweek ranked CDO 408th on its list of the nation's top public high schools (top 1.5% in the U.S.) CDO Won the state competition in Academic Decathlon and ranked 5th nationally 
2010: CDO finished as State Runner-Up in the Academic Decathlon state competition, and ranked 7th nationally 
 2009: Kenzie Fowler was named the Gatorade National Softball Player of the Year in 2009 for the second consecutive year, and the first softball player to ever win the award twice. Fowler became only the 6th athlete in any sport to win the national honor twice, joining the ranks of basketball player LeBron James, and track star Marion Jones. Fowler ended her pitching career at CDO with a 105–8 record, and a 0.15 ERA in 685 innings. With the honor, the media noted that the award arguably cemented "Fowler as the best-ever modern high school softball player."  Also in 2009, CDO teams finished as the 4A Division I Softball State Champions, 4A Division I Baseball State Champions, Fourth Place in the U.S. Academic Decathlon National Competition, Arizona Academic Decathlon State Champions, 4A Division I Girls' Basketball State Champions, and 4A Division I Boys' Soccer State Champions.
 2008: Kenzie Fowler received high school softball's most prestigious award, being named the Gatorade National Softball Player of the Year in 2008. Fowler was the first junior to ever win Gatorade's softball award, and just the second athlete from Arizona to win the national honor in any sport. CDO's Bre Ladd was the other Arizona athlete, named Gatorade's National Volleyball Player of the Year in 2002. Also in 2008, CDO had a first place student finish in the Arizona State Math Contest, with four other students placed in the state's top 50 scorers, First place finish at the Southern Arizona Regional Science Fair, 4A Division I Softball State Champions, Softball team finished the season ranked 5th nationally by USA Today, and Arizona Academic Decathlon State Runner-Up and ranked in the top 20 nationally.
 2007: 4A Division I Softball State Champions, 4A Division I Boys' Soccer State Runner-Up, 4A Division I Football State Runner-Up, Newsweek Magazine's list of the top 5% of public schools in the U.S., Arizona Academic Decathlon State Runner-Up, Softball team finished the season ranked 2nd nationally by USA Today.
 2006: Arizona Academic Decathlon State Champions, 5th place in the National Academic Decathlon, 4A Division I Girls' Track & Field State Champions, Five students placed in the state's top 50 scorers in the Arizona State Math Contest, with another 10 students scoring in the top 10 percent in the state.
 Named an Excelling School by the Arizona Department of Education (2005–present).
 Southern Region Academic Decathlon Champions (2002–2010).

History

Financing through bonds 
The dramatic population growth in the Amphitheater School District during the 1950s placed increasing demands on the district's existing schools. Enrollment reached capacity at the district's sole high school, Amphitheater High School, in the late 1950s. As a result, District Superintendent Marion Donaldson developed a bond proposal in June 1959 that included the purchase of a second high school site in the district. Voters approved the $1.9 million bonds ($12.8 million in 2006) by a 4 to 1 margin. Population growth in the area north of the Rillito River and Tucson was rapidly expanding, and the original  purchased for the second high school was then determined to initially serve a middle school population as well. Another bond issue was proposed for the construction of Canyon del Oro School in June 1961, with $1.4 million ($9.2 million in 2006) for the first phase of the school, and $2.3 million ($15.3 million in 2006) for expansion of the school. Voters again approved the bonds by a 3 to 1 margin (Amphitheater by Peyton Reavis, 1981).

Canyon del Oro Junior High School 
Canyon del Oro School opened as a junior high school in the fall of 1962 with only a seventh grade class. The campus was only a few buildings with a large grass courtyard accessed by Calle Concordia, which was then only a small dirt road. Land values north of Tucson were beginning to appreciate through the 1950s, and many residents of the Amphitheater School District expressed concern that the site of the school in the foothills of the Santa Catalina Mountains was too costly (Amphitheater by Peyton Reavis, 1981).

The school added a new grade level each year, and Canyon del Oro High School was established in the fall of 1964 with a ninth grade class. CDO was formally declared a high school by the Arizona on July 1, 1965, serving grades 9–10, with only a few hundred students. Canyon del Oro Junior High School would continue operation on the same campus as a distinct school, serving grades 7–8 until 1974, when L.W. Cross Junior High School was established on a separate campus to accommodate grades 7–8.

Canyon del Oro High School 
Construction continued on the high school campus, and CDO gained recognition as a school of privilege with state-of-the-art facilities, and drew students from the most affluent sections of the Tucson area. The campus was designed in a Modernist style by architects Bernard Friedman and Fred Jobusch (Friedman & Jobusch) to be completed in phases. Friedman & Jobusch also designed the contemporary Main Library at the University of Arizona in 1976.

The Modernist style incorporated into the Canyon del Oro campus design in the early 1960s is a significant example of the Modernist movement that dominated in the U.S. following World War II. The Canyon del Oro campus represents a shift in 20th-century American architecture when Modernism was favored over traditional styles in an effort to project American progress. The gymnasium at the school featured a four-sided score board suspended above the basketball court (Amphitheater by Peyton Reavis, 1981).

The CDO campus expanded with the gradual population increase north of Tucson, and the first graduating class was in the spring of 1968. New construction occurred through the late 1990s, adding technology and laboratory science facilities for chemistry, physics, and biology. A second gymnasium was completed in the 1970s, along with an expanded library, fine arts complex, and bookstore.

Among the most notable families whose children attended CDO during the 1960s and 1970s was the Udall family. Mo Udall represented much of southern Arizona in the U.S. House of Representatives at the time, and his brother Stewart Udall served as president of the Amphitheater School Board before later serving as Secretary of the Interior under U.S. Presidents John F. Kennedy and Lyndon B. Johnson.

From the 1960s through the 1980s, CDO became a dominating presence in golf and tennis, capturing the respective state titles nearly each year. CDO also won back-to-back state championships in both basketball and football in the late 1970s. The CDO girls' basketball team registered an undefeated 28–0 record in 1987, capturing the 5A State title (Arizona Interscholastic Association).

Substantial growth 
As the Oro Valley area experienced significant population growth in the 1990s, enrollment at CDO increased as well. At its enrollment peak, CDO served a student population of nearly 3,100 in 2001. CDO had the highest enrollment of any high school in southern Arizona, and was one of the largest schools in the state. The growth and desirability of Oro Valley (the fastest growing municipality in Arizona for several years in the 1990s), was often credited by the media to CDO and the educational reputation the school established (Arizona Daily Star). In 2001, CDO received relief as the Amphitheater School District opened Ironwood Ridge, the district's third high school, in northwestern Oro Valley.

Current state of the school 
Canyon del Oro continues to register among the highest standardized test scores in Arizona, and a notable number of National Merit Scholars. CDO is one of the few high schools consistently designated as "Excelling" (the highest academic distinction) by the Arizona Department of Education. Canyon del Oro High School celebrated its 50th anniversary of establishment in the fall of 2014.

Notable Events 
On September 21, 1999, 1500 students (roughly half the student population) walked out of classes in protest of low teacher pay. The students walked nearly 8 miles to the Amphitheater District offices at 701 W. Wetmore Rd. In solidarity, many of the teachers chose not to mark students absent from classes.

Academics 
Throughout CDO's history, the school has continually ranked among the top high schools in Arizona in standardized test administrations and academic performance evaluations by the Arizona Department of Education. As a comprehensive institution, the course selection at CDO is extensive. The school offers 17 Advanced Placement courses, among the widest variety available. 
CDO offers:

 Art History
 Biology
 Calculus AB & BC
 Chemistry
 Computer Science
 English Language & Composition
 English Literature & Composition
 French
 German
 Economics
 Music Theory
 Physics C: Mechanics
 Psychology
 Spanish Language
 Statistics
 Studio Art
 U.S. History
 U.S. Government & Politics
 World History

Over 90% of the school's graduates seek post-secondary education. Half (49.5%) of CDO faculty have attained a master's degree or a PhD. As for faculty recognition, Librarian Beth Malapanes was selected Circle K/UA Athletics/KOLD Teacher of the Year for the Tucson area in 2007. In 2006, family and consumer sciences teacher Patti Schmalzel was also selected Circle K/UA Athletics/KOLD Teacher of the Year for the Tucson area. Canyon del Oro is under accreditation by the North Central Association.

CDO has graduated among the highest number of National Merit Scholars in Arizona. Scholars have been represented in every graduating class since the school's first class in 1968, with the exception of two years (2000 & 2002). In 2006 alone, the school had seven National Merit Finalists. The school has also promoted several Flinn Scholars of the Flinn Foundation into the state's public universities.

Achievement rates on Advanced Placement exams, particularly in the laboratory sciences and mathematics, have historically far exceeded the national average. The school's journalism department has been recognized by the Interscholastic Press Association for its school newspaper, The Palantir, and the yearbook, Años de Oro. Since the school opened in the 1960s, CDO has also had a notable history in chess, with teams continually ranked nationally.

Career and Technical Education Programs 

Canyon del Oro offers twelve different CTE programs for the students to participate in. The CTE courses at CDO are dedicated to providing a hands-on experience for all students and the primary focus of the CTE programs is to prepare students for college and career readiness by using 21st century skills. CTE is preparing students of all ages to help drive America's success and vitality. Further, it is creating an educational environment that integrates core academics with real-world relevance. CTE is leading this change, transforming expectations and making a difference for students, for secondary and postsecondary schools, for businesses and industry—for America.
CDO offers:
 Architectural Drafting
 Automotive Technology
 Bioscience
 Computer Science 
 Construction Technology
 Culinary
 Digital Photography
 Early Childhood Education
 Engineering
 Sports Medicine
 Technical Theater

IB Programme 
In the 2012–13 school year, CDO began offering the IB Diploma Programme to its students. CDO is now a full-fledged IB School.

Other Notable Courses
CDO offers Russian and Mandarin Chinese classes, as well as many other courses through JTED programs and Pima Community College.

Extracurricular activities 
The extracurricular activities offered at CDO are numerous and varied. There are chapters of national organizations such as the National Honor Society and clubs founded by CDO students such as Science Explorer, in which students promote science through practical activities in the local community. Service organizations such as Key Club coexist alongside recreational clubs.

Athletics 
Competing in the 5A Division for 25 years, the school captured several hundred championship titles (region and state). Such championships include 7 state crowns in baseball (most recently a 5A title in 2002, and a 4A-I title in 2009), 9 state titles in softball (most recently a 4A title in 2017, and 4A-I titles in 2007, 2008, 2009, 2011 and 2012), 11 team state titles in boys' tennis, 6 team state titles in girls' tennis, 9 team state titles in boys' golf (most recently a Division II title in 2011), and 4 team state titles in girls' track and field (most recently a 4A-I title in 2011). Due to recent downsizing from the opening of a new high school, CDO presently competes in the Arizona Interscholastic Association 4A Sonoran Conference, Division I (Arizona Interscholastic Association).

Football 
After winning back-to-back state championships in 1976 and 1977, the Canyon del Oro football program experienced difficulty repeating such success. CDO began to revamp its football program in the 2000 season resulting in a 6–4 overall record in 5A play. The following year CDO recorded a 7–3 regular season, falling to perennial powerhouse Mesa Mountain View in the opening round of the 5A state playoffs. After dropping to 4A due to an enrollment decline, CDO's football program has experienced marked recent success, including several berths in the state playoffs. In 2007 CDO finished a 9–1 regular season, the sole loss to Glendale Cactus 36–34. Victories followed over Cienega High School, Prescott High School, and Peoria High School in the opening, quarterfinal, and semifinal rounds of the 4A state playoffs. CDO reached the 4A State Championship, ultimately losing to the defending State Champion, Scottsdale Saguaro High School, 23–21 after a field goal by the Sabercats with two seconds remaining in play.

In 2009, CDO finished 10–0 in the regular season (Division 4A-I), including an impressive win over three-time defending State Champion Saguaro Sabercats 44–0, ending their 37-game winning streak. In the 2009 Division 4A-I playoffs, the top-seeded Dorados went on to beat the McClintock Chargers (49–26), the Apollo Hawks (63–35), and the Cienega Bobcats (48–16) to get them into the state championship game. In that game, held at Arizona Stadium in Tucson, Arizona on December 5, 2009, the Canyon del Oro Dorados defeated the Sabino Sabercats (also of Tucson) 40–0 to win the State Championship for the first time since 1977. He also threw for a touchdown in the third quarter to cap off a perfect 14–0 season for the Dorados. The win secured the 3rd state championship for CDO.

In 2010, CDO finished the season with a 13–1 record, and as State Runner-Up behind Saguaro High School of Scottsdale. The team's only loss in the State Championship snapped the school's 27-game winning streak.

Baseball 
Canyon del Oro baseball is well known for its prominence in Arizona and the U.S. CDO's most recent baseball state titles include 1997, 2000, 2002, 2009 and 2015. CDO baseball has produced a significant number of players drafted by Major League Baseball. The 2002 State Championship team merits special distinction, as it was ranked 12th, out of more than 1,000 other high schools, nationally by USA Today. This team finished with a record of 27–6, never losing a home game (Arizona Interscholastic Association). The 5A State Championship baseball team finished the 1997 season ranked 25th nationally by USA Today.

In 2009, CDO won the 4A-I State Championship, topping No. 1 seed Glendale Cactus with a score of 15–5, and finishing the season with a 24–7 record. The title marks the 7th baseball state championship at CDO.

Softball 
Canyon del Oro softball is a successful program as well, with nine state titles. The softball program has three 5A state titles (1992, 2001 and 2005), and has won the 2007, 2008, 2009, 2011, 2012, and 2017 4A Division state titles. The 2017 state championship team finished 33-2 and was ranked number one in the state of Arizona in the 4A Division. The 2009 state championship team finished the season with a 34–2 record. The 2008 state championship team finished the season with a 33–4 record, and ranked 5th nationally by USA Today. The 2007 state championship team finished the season with a 33–3 record, ranked 2nd nationally by USA Today. The team also ranked 14th in 2006, 18th in 2005, and 6th in 2001 in the USA Today national rankings. As of 2007, the CDO program had produced 24 Division I softball players, along with a 397–106 record since the program's first state title in 1992.

Volleyball 
Recently, boys' volleyball has been recognized nationally. CDO boys' volleyball won the Arizona 5A State title in 1996 and fielded one of the school's most successful teams in 2005. In 2005, the team compiled a record of 40–3, and despite losing the state title game, CDO was widely recognized as one of the premier boys' volleyball teams in the nation (Arizona Interscholastic Association).

Soccer 
Boys' soccer has also experienced recent success. The CDO team captured the school's first boys' soccer state championship in 2009, with a 2–1 win over Scottsdale Chaparral. The team finished State Runner-Up in 2007, losing to Rincon 3–2.

Athletic state titles 

CDO teams and individuals have won over 90 State Championships, and placed as the State Runner-Up over 40 times. CDO has also had 9 athletes medal in boys' golf, most recently in 2011. In 2011 the boys' cross country team won the Division II state title over runner-up Ironwood Ridge. This was the first state championship for boys' cross country in school history.

In 1993, the school won Arizona's Tony Komadina Award for its girls' athletic program and received the Overall Excellence Award for the highest achieving athletic program in Arizona seven times. CDO has won more 4A and 5A state championships than all other schools in southern Arizona, with the exception of the oldest, Tucson High School (Arizona Interscholastic Association).

Below is a comprehensive table including all athletic state titles won by CDO teams. Canyon del Oro teams competed at the 3A equivalent level from fall 1966 to spring 1968, and the 4A equivalent level from fall 1968 to spring 1980. Between fall 1980 and spring 2005, CDO teams competed at the 5A level, resuming 4A competition from fall 2005 to 2009. The AIA reclassified class 4A-I as Division II in 2010.

Academics

Academic Decathlon 
Canyon del Oro is home to one of the top performing Academic Decathlon teams in Arizona. The CDO team is a perennial powerhouse in the region, defeating other academically reputable schools in the area nearly every year. As of 2010, the team had captured nine consecutive region titles.

The CDO team placed 4th in the Arizona Academic Decathlon State Competition in 2002, 3rd in the state in 2003, State Runner-Up in 2004, and 3rd in the state in 2005. In 2006 the team became the Arizona Academic Decathlon State Champions, outscoring defending state champs Mesa Mountain View 46,482 points to 46,406 points. CDO represented Arizona in the National competition, placing 5th. In 2007, the team scored 45,667 points, placing second in the state behind Mesa Mountain View with 47,402 points. In 2008, the team scored 46,600 points, placing second in the state for the second consecutive year.

In 2009, CDO once again became the Arizona Academic Decathlon State Champions, outscoring Mesa Red Mountain 47,055.5 points to 44,052.2 points. The CDO team placed 4th in the U.S. Academic Decathlon National Competition, in representing Arizona, with 47,972.3 points. CDO placed behind Moorpark High School of California (51,289.5 points), Waukesha West High School of Wisconsin (50,979.9 points), and Burke High School of Nebraska (48,064.0 points).

In 2010, CDO placed as State Runner-Up behind Mesa Mountain View, with the team scoring 47,892.4 points.

In 2011, CDO was the State Champion in Arizona, and finished 5th in the National Competition with 46,522.7 points.

In 2012, CDO placed as State Runner-Up behind Mesa Mountain View, with the team scoring 44,962 points.

In 2013, CDO placed as State Runner-Up behind Red Mountain. At the National Competition, the team placed 9th overall.

Science Olympiad 
CDO has an active Science Olympiad program, which has placed well in the state tournament in years past. This program is run by students and the AP Biology teacher, Dr. Zeiher. Other science teachers are becoming involved in the success of this program, notably Mrs. Christman of the chemistry department. Students create functioning robots and helicopters, as well as utilize high-tech protein modeling programs. In 2009, the team was Rookie of the Year at the state competition. The CDO team placed second in robotics during the state competition of 2011, but students aim to surpass this in years to come.

Academic Challenges 
The Future Problem Solving Team won first place in the state competition in 2001. It also won second place in the state competition and sixth place in the national competition in 2006.

Notable alumni

Academia 

Keith A. Nelson, Massachusetts Institute of Technology Professor of Chemistry
Joseph Polchinski, University of California at Santa Barbara (high energy physics, string theory)

Arts and entertainment 

 Kyle Balda (1989), co-director of animated film The Lorax and director of animated film Minions
 Brianne Leary (1975), actress and inventor, former host of The Disney Channel's Walt Disney World Inside Out and Animal Planet's Petsburgh USA
 Tom Zoellner (1987), author of Train: Riding the Rails that Created the Modern World, from the Trans-Siberian to the Southwest Chief
 Amy Gold (1980), author of Black Print with a White Carnation: Mildred Brown and the Omaha Star Newspaper, 1938-1989 and author of Borrowing from our Foremothers

 Journalism 
Masha Hamilton, journalist and novelist (Concern Worldwide, Associated Press)
Kathleen Kirkwood, Pulitzer Prize journalist (East Bay Times)

 Politics 

 Jonathan Rothschild (1973), elected Mayor of Tucson, Arizona in 2011
 Mark Udall (1968), elected U.S. Senator for the Colorado in 2008; former U.S. Representative for District 2 of Colorado (primarily the Boulder area) from 1999 until taking his seat in the U.S. Senate in 2009

 Sports 

 Brian Anderson (2000), outfielder for the Kansas City Royals of Major League Baseball
 Callista Balko (2004), softball player (starting catcher) for the 2006 and 2007 University of Arizona NCAA Women's College World Series National Championship teams
 Ka'deem Carey (2011), running back for the Calgary Stampeders of the Canadian Football League, running back for the University of Arizona (2011-2014); nominee for the Heisman Trophy (2013)
 Chris Duncan (1999), baseball player for the St. Louis Cardinals of Major League Baseball
 Shelley Duncan (1998), outfielder for the New York Yankees of Major League Baseball
 Scott Hairston (1999), outfielder for the Oakland Athletics of Major League Baseball
 Ryan Hietala (1992), professional golfer in the PGA, 1995 WAC Player of the Year
 Ed Hochuli (1969), Super Bowl referee official for the National Football League
 Ian Kinsler (2000), Israeli-American 4x All Star second baseman in Major League Baseball
 Blake Martinez (2012), inside linebacker for the New York Giants, of the National Football League
 Colin Porter (1994), outfielder for the Houston Astros, St. Louis Cardinals, New York Yankees of Major League Baseball
 George Roop (2000), professional mixed martial artist, former cast member of SpikeTV's The Ultimate Fighter: Team Nogueira vs. Team Mir, former UFC fighter
 Jason Stanford (1995), pitcher for the Cleveland Indians of Major League Baseball
 Jaide Stepter Baynes (2012), Track and field athlete
 Donny Toia (2010), Defender for Real Salt Lake, of Major League Soccer

 Attendance boundaries 
The attendance boundaries of Canyon del Oro encompass segments of the communities of Oro Valley, Casas Adobes, and Catalina Foothills.

The northern boundary roughly follows the Cañada del Oro and East/West Lambert Lane. The eastern boundary is defined by Catalina State Park and the Coronado National Forest/Pusch Ridge Wilderness Area. The southern boundary is East/West Orange Grove Road from North Shannon Road east to North First Avenue. Between North First Avenue and the North Alvernon Road parallel, East Ina Road is the southern boundary (including the neighborhoods of Pima Canyon Estates and Cobblestone Estates). The western boundary is North Shannon Road.

 Feeder schools 
Elementary schools in the Canyon del Oro attendance area include Marion Donaldson, Winifred Harelson, Mesa Verde, and Copper Creek. L.W. Cross Middle School and Wilson K-8 Middle School feeding into Canyon del Oro.

 Enrollment history 

CDO opened in the fall of 1962 with a limited enrollment of only grade 7, and by 1965 the school had a high school enrollment of 283 students (specifically grades 9–10.) In its first year as a four-year high school with grades 9–12, CDO had an enrollment of 560 students. Enrollment gradually increased, exceeding 1,000 students in 1972, 2,000 students in 1987, and 3,000 students in the fall of 2000. The largest enrollment was 3,080 in 2000 (when CDO was the 6th largest high school in Arizona), and declined to 1,700 in 2005 due to the establishment of a new high school (Ironwood Ridge High School) in the fall of 2001. Due to open enrollment, CDO has sustained enrollment above 1,800 in recent years (Arizona Interscholastic Association'').

References

External links 
 Amphitheater Public Schools
 Arizona Department of Education School Report Card
 Town of Oro Valley

Public high schools in Arizona
Schools in Pima County, Arizona
Educational institutions established in 1964
1964 establishments in Arizona
Modernist architecture in Arizona
International Baccalaureate schools in Arizona